Sucesos de las Islas Filipinas (English: Events in the Philippine Islands) is a book written and published by Antonio de Morga considered one of the most important works on the early history of the Spanish colonization of the Philippines. It was published in 1609 after he was reassigned to Mexico in two volumes by Casa de Geronymo Balli, in Mexico City. The first English translation was published in London in 1868 and another English translation by Blair and Robertson was published in Cleveland in 1907.

The work greatly impressed the Philippine national hero José Rizal and decided to annotate it and publish a new edition and began working on it in London and completing it in Paris in 1890.

History
Antonio de Morga's Sucesos De Las Islas Filipinas has been recognized as a first-hand account of Spanish colonial venture in Asia during the 16th century. The book was first published in Mexico in 1609 and has been re-edited number of times. The Hakluyt Society, a text publication society in 1851 catches its attention and an edition was prepared by H. E. J. Stanley but was only published in 1868.

Sucesos De Las Islas Filipinas is based on Antonio de Morga's personal experiences and other documentations from eye-witnesses of the events such as the survivors of Miguel López de Legazpi's Philippine expedition.

Contents

The title literary means  Events in the Philippine Islands and thus the books primary goal is a documentation of events during the Spanish colonial period of the Philippines as observed by the author himself. The book also includes Filipino customs, traditions, manners, and religion during the Spanish conquest.

References

Philippine books
Spanish-language books
Primary sources on Philippine history in the 16th century